Erik Christian Larsen (20 February 1928 – 10 April 1952) was a Danish rower who competed in the 1948 Summer Olympics.

He was born in Herfølge, Køge Municipality and died in Ringsted, Region Sjælland. In 1948 he was a crew member of the Danish boat which won the bronze medal in the coxed four event. He won a gold medal in single scull at the 1950 European Rowing Championships in Milan.

References

1928 births
1952 deaths
Danish male rowers
Olympic rowers of Denmark
Rowers at the 1948 Summer Olympics
Olympic bronze medalists for Denmark
Olympic medalists in rowing
People from Køge Municipality
Medalists at the 1948 Summer Olympics
European Rowing Championships medalists
Sportspeople from Region Zealand